Sophie Taylor (born 12 September 1995) is an Australian field hockey player.

Personal life
Taylor was born in Camberwell, Victoria, and plays representative hockey for the Victorian Vipers.

Career

Junior national team
Taylor made her debut for the junior national team at the 2016 Junior Oceania Cup, helping the team to qualification for the Junior World Cup.

Taylor was part of the Australian women's junior national team 'The Jillaroos' that won bronze at the 2016 Hockey Junior World Cup in Chile.

Senior national team
Taylor will make her international debut at the 2018 Sompo Cup in Ibaraki, Japan.

As of May 2018, Taylor is a member of the Australian women's national development squad.

References

External links
 
 
 

1995 births
Living people
Australian female field hockey players
Female field hockey defenders
Field hockey players from Melbourne
People from Camberwell, Victoria
Sportswomen from Victoria (Australia)
21st-century Australian women